was a village located in Takaoka District, Kōchi Prefecture, Japan.

As of 2003, the village had an estimated population of 1,602 and a density of 15.95 persons per km2. The total area was 100.41 km2.

On January 1, 2006, Ōnomi was merged into the expanded town of Nakatosa.

External links
 Official website of Nakatosa  

Dissolved municipalities of Kōchi Prefecture